Hnatiuk is a gender-neutral Ukrainian surname. It may refer to:

 Dmytro Hnatiuk or Hnatyuk (1925–2016), Ukrainian opera singer and politician
 Glen Hnatiuk (born 1965), Canadian golfer
 Halyna Hnatiuk or Hnatyuk (1927–2016), Ukrainian linguist, wifa of Dmytro Hnatiuk
 Jim Hnatiuk (1950–2018), Canadian politician
 Mykola Hnatiuk or Hnatiuk (born 1952), Ukrainian singer
 Roger Hnatiuk (born 1946), Canadian-Australian botanist
 Volodymyr Hnatiuk (1871–1926), Ukrainian writer

See also
 
 
 Hnatyuk

References

Ukrainian-language surnames